Imre Molnár (30 March 1949 – 26 September 2019) was a Hungarian gymnast. He competed at the 1972 and the 1976 Summer Olympics.

References

1949 births
2019 deaths
Hungarian male artistic gymnasts
Olympic gymnasts of Hungary
Gymnasts at the 1972 Summer Olympics
Gymnasts at the 1976 Summer Olympics
Sportspeople from Miskolc